Edisto Beach State Park is located on the coast of South Carolina,  south of Charleston, near the town of Edisto Beach in Colleton County.

The park offers South Carolina's longest system of handicapped accessible hiking and biking trails. The trails wind through Edisto Island's maritime forest, leading to sites such as a Native American shell midden dated to 2000 BC, and a survey monument placed by Alexander Bache in 1850.

Activities possible at the park include surf fishing for flounder, spot tail and whiting, as well as boating, birding and picnicking.

The park's education center, the Edisto Interpretive Center, hosts a number of programs and research services. The center includes an exhibit teaching visitors about the ACE Basin estuarine reserve through interactive displays.

History 
The park was one of the first South Carolina state parks, developed by the Civilian Conservation Corps. It was created on land donated in 1935 by the Edisto Company. Many of the original buildings built by the CCC still stand and are in use currently.

References

External links 
 
Edisto Beach Hiking Trails
The CCC and SC's State Parks
Discover South Carolina
 SC Dept of Parks, Recreation and Tourism
Video about the Edisto Interpretive Center
"The New Interpretive Center at Edisto Beach", South Carolina Heritage Corridor, Autumn 2004

State parks of South Carolina
Nature centers in South Carolina
Civilian Conservation Corps in South Carolina
Protected areas of Colleton County, South Carolina
Education in Colleton County, South Carolina
National Park Service Rustic architecture